Paolo Benetti (born 28 April 1965) is an Italian football manager who is current vice coach of Serie B club Cagliari.

Career

Playing career

Benetti started his career with Italian Serie A side Milan, where he made 1 league appearance and scored 0 goals. In 1983, he signed for Fano in the Italian third division. In 1987, Benetti signed for Italian Serie A club Ascoli, where he suffered relegation to the Italian second division and received interest from Napoli in the Italian Serie A, but manager Claudio Ranieri refused to sign him because they were brothers-in-law. In 1995, Benetti signed for Italian third division team Siena. In 1996, he signed for Venezia in the Italian second division. In 1997, he signed for Italian third division outfit Triestina.

Managerial career

In 2012, Benetti was appointed assistant manager of French Ligue 1 side Monaco. In 2014, he was appointed technical coach of Greece. In 2015, he was appointed assistant manager of Leicester in the English Premier League, helping them win their only top flight title. In 2017, Benetti was appointed assistant manager of French club Nantes.

References

1965 births
Living people
Sportspeople from the Metropolitan City of Milan
A.C. Milan players
Italian footballers
Italian football managers
Alma Juventus Fano 1906 players
U.S. Catanzaro 1929 players
Ascoli Calcio 1898 F.C. players
A.C.N. Siena 1904 players
Venezia F.C. players
U.S. Triestina Calcio 1918 players
A.C. Carpi players
S.S. Lazio non-playing staff
Juventus F.C. non-playing staff
A.S. Roma non-playing staff
Inter Milan non-playing staff
AS Monaco FC non-playing staff
Leicester City F.C. non-playing staff
FC Nantes non-playing staff
Fulham F.C. non-playing staff
Watford F.C. non-playing staff
Footballers from Lombardy